Kiang Wu Hospital (KWH) is a privately owned hospital located in Santo António, Macau. It is one of the three hospitals in Macau. Founded in 1871, the hospital is run by the Kiang Wu Charitable Association and offered Chinese medical services. Renowned doctor Sun Yat-Sen brought Western medicine services to the hospital. The hospital has had four different sites, the last built in 2000.

Till 2019 there was no Western-style medical school in Macau, so all indigenous intending doctors have to either qualify overseas, or qualified doctors have to be brought in from outside.  Macau University of Science and Technology started a medical school in Macau in September 2019 for its MBBS program. The second batch of students started their classes on 21 September 2020. Clinical training of medical students will start from third year of medical training in the university hospital associated with the university. The medical school has been listed in the world directory of medical schools. Medium of instruction in the medical school is English. Most of the students are from Macau. The duration of MBBS course is 5 years with an additional year for internship.

The hospital is not currently engaged in international healthcare accreditation.

Staff
, the hospital had over 340 doctors and over 800 nurses. The doctors were trained at universities in Mainland China and Taiwan, with about one-third each graduating from the School of Medicine at Jinan University and the Zhongshan School of Medicine. The nurses earned certificates in nursing at schools in Mainland China, at Macao Polytechnic University (formerly Macao Polytechnic Institute), and at Kiang Wu itself.

Kiang Wu Nursing College of Macau

Established in 1923 as Kiang Wu Nursing School by the Kiang Wu Charitable Association and provided nursing staff for Kiang Wu Hospital. It became a degree granting college (Bachelor of Science in Nursing) in 2002.

See also
Healthcare in Macau
List of hospitals in Macau
List of hospitals in China

References

External links

 Kiang Wu Hospital - in Chinese

Hospitals in Macau
Hospital buildings completed in 2000
Hospitals established in 1871
1871 establishments in the Portuguese Empire